Heilongjiang Television  (HLJTV), is a television network in the Heilongjiang province of China. The Heilongjiang Television and Radio Broadcast Center is located in the Long Ta (Dragon Tower). It is associated with Long Guang through the Heilongjiang Radio and TV Group. Its logo is both the English letter "H" and the Chinese character "龙", depending on how one looks at it.

List of Heilongjiang Television channels

References

External links
  

Television networks in China
Television stations in China
Television channels and stations established in 1958
Mass media in Harbin
1958 establishments in China